Unseen or The Unseen may refer to: cannot to be seen

Film 
 The Unseen (1945 film), an American ghost film directed by Lewis Allen
 The Unseen (1980 film), an American horror film directed by Danny Steinmann
 The Unseen (2005 film), a film featuring Gale Harold & Michelle Clunie
 The Unseen (2016 film), a Canadian horror film directed by Geoff Redknap
 Unseen, a 2016 documentary film directed by Laura Paglin about sex offender Anthony Sowell
 The Unseen (2017 film), a British psychological thriller film directed by Gary Sinyor

Music 
 The Unseen (band), an American punk rock band
 Unseen (The Handsome Family album), 2016
 Unseen (The Haunted album), 2011, or the title song
 The Unseen (album), a 2000 album by Madlib, recording as Quasimoto
 "Unseen", a song by Heaven 17
 "Unseen", a song by Your Memorial from the 2010 album Atonement

Literature 
 Unseen (book), a 1998 short-story collection by Paul Jennings
 Unseen (Buffy/Angel novel), a 2001 trilogy by Nancy Holder and Jeff Mariotte
 The Unseen (novel), a 1990 novel by Joseph A. Citro
 The Unseen (comics), alias of Nick Fury when replacing The Watcher in Marvel Comics universe
 The Unseen, a 2004 novel by Zilpha Keatley Snyder
 The Unseen, a 1989 novel by Nanni Balestrini
 Unseen, a member of the Spaceknights in the Marvel Comics universe

Other
Unseen (organization), a UK-based anti-slavery organization and charity
al-Ghaib, hidden realities
 Unseen, a series of designs once used in the tabletop game BattleTech
 HMS Unseen
 H.M.S. Unseen (novel), a naval thriller published in 1999 by Patrick Robinson
Unseen (audio comic) - an audiobook

See also
 
 Invisibility, the state of an object that cannot be seen
 Seen (disambiguation)
 Sight Unseen (disambiguation)